Scrivner's Drive-In was a chain of drive-ins in Los Angeles, California. They were owned by Paul Scrivner and were popular hangouts for teens in the 1950s. The most famous location was at the corner of Sunset and Cahuenga Boulevards. From 1955 to 1959,  Los Angeles radio personality Art Laboe broadcast his live radio show from the parking lot and began taking requests and dedications from the teenagers who would gather.

Scrivner's also had locations at the corners of Crenshaw and Jefferson, Crenshaw and Manchester, Imperial Highway and Western, Wilshire and Crenshaw, and Western and Slauson.  None remain.

References

Defunct restaurants in Los Angeles
Drive-in restaurants
Restaurants in Los Angeles